The following buildings are located on Middlebury College's campus in the Champlain Valley in Vermont, United States.

List of Middlebury College buildings on Middlebury, Vermont campus

See also

Middlebury College
Middlebury, Vermont
Middlebury College Snow Bowl

References

External links
 Official website
 Middlebury College campus maps

Buildings
Middlebury College
Buildings and structures in Addison County, Vermont
Middlebury College